Tural Rzayev (born 26 August 1993) is an Azerbaijani footballer who plays as a midfielder for Kapaz in the Azerbaijan Premier League.

Club career
On 9 August 2015, Rzayev made his debut in the Azerbaijan Premier League for Kapaz match against Neftçi.

References

External links
 

1993 births
Living people
Association football midfielders
Azerbaijani footballers
Azerbaijani expatriate footballers
Expatriate footballers in Lithuania
Azerbaijan Premier League players
A Lyga players
Kapaz PFK players
FK Jonava players